The 2006 Royal Trophy was the first edition of the Royal Trophy, a team golf event contested between teams representing Asia and Europe. It was held from 7–8 January at the Amata Spring Country Club in Thailand. Europe won the inaugural trophy with a 9–7 victory over Asia.

Teams

Schedule
7 January (Saturday morning) Foursomes x 4
7 January (Saturday afternoon) Four-ball x 4
8 January (Sunday) Singles x 8

Saturday morning matches (foursomes)

Source:

Saturday afternoon matches (four-ball)

Source:

Sunday's matches (singles)

Source:

References

External links
Official site
Results and reports from Golf Today

Royal Trophy
Golf tournaments in Thailand
Royal Trophy
Royal Trophy
Royal Trophy